Javier Perianes (born in 1978 in Nerva, Spain) is a Spanish classical pianist. He is a participant at many renowned festivals within Spain, including Santander, Granada, Peralada and San Sebastián. He has performed in distinguished concert series throughout the world, having made appearances in New York City's Carnegie Hall, Washington DC  Concertgebouw Amsterdam, the Tchaikovsky Conservatory in Moscow, the Shanghai Conservatory, Madrid's Auditorio Nacional, Palau in Barcelona, recitals at the Ravinia and Gilmore International Festivals in Chicago, Festival de La Roque-d'Anthéron in France and the Konzerthaus in Berlin.

He has been a frequent prize-winner at competitions, including First Prize and Gold Medal at the 42nd International Competition Premio Jaén de Piano; First Prize at the 8th International Piano Competition Fundación Jacinto e Inocencio Guerrero; and was a prize-winner at the 14th International Competition Vianna da Motta in Lisbon.

Perianes has worked with leading conductors including Lorin Maazel, Daniel Barenboim, Zubin Mehta, Rafael Frühbeck de Burgos, Jesús López Cobos, Antoni Wit, Daniel Harding and Vasily Petrenko. Recent and forthcoming highlights include appearances with the Israel Philharmonic under Zubin Mehta, including a performance at the Lucerne Festival, the New World Symphony conducted by Michael Tilson Thomas, the London Philharmonic and Sao Paulo Symphony with Eduardo Portal, Tokyo Symphony Orchestra with Hiroshi Kodama, Warsaw Philharmonic, as well as recitals in Tokyo, Madrid’s Scherzo series, the Zurich Tonhalle and at the Moscow December Nights Festival.

Perianes has received critical acclaim for his recordings on Harmonia Mundi of Schubert's Impromptus and Klavierstücke, MendelssohnManuel Blasco de Nebra’s keyboard sonatas and Federico Mompou’s Música Callada. In September 2011, he released on this label a disc devoted to the music for piano by Manuel de Falla, including a live recording of Nights in the Gardens of Spain with the BBC Symphony Orchestra under Josep Pons.

In 2015, he released a recording of Grieg's Piano Concerto, accompanied by the BBC Symphony Orchestra under Sakari Oramo, coupled with a selection of the composer's Lyric Pieces.

Quote from the Michael Kennedy of the Sunday Telegraph regarding his Schubert CD (Harmonia Mundi):
"This young Spanish pianist proves himself a natural Schubertian in the Impromptus (D 899). He is beautifully recorded so that his playing can be fully appreciated. The disc also includes the Klavierstücke (D 946) and the less well-known Allegretto in C minor (D 915), a wonderful piece all the more compelling for being understated. Perianes's playing captures its magic to perfection."

Discography

 Claude Debussy, Preludes, Estampas, HM, 2018
 Claude Debussy,  Sonata  cello and piano, Jean Guihen Queyras, cello, HM 2018
 Bela Bartok, Concerto N 3, Pablo Heras-Casado (2017)
 Granados, Turina, Cuarteto Quiroga, 2017
 Mendelssohn, Songs without words, HM
 ..les sons et les parfums, Chopin - Debussy (2013).
 Franz Schubert / Impromptus
 Franz Schubert, Sonatas 13 - 21,
 Federico Mompou / Música Callada. Harmonia Mundi (2006)
 Manuel Blasco de Nebra / Sonatas. Harmonia Mundi (2010)
 Recital Patio de los Arrayanes 2005 (Disco Excepcional Scherzo octubre de 2006). 
 Beethoven / Moto perpetuo (Sonatas Op.26, 31, 54, 90). Harmonia Mundi (2012)
 Manuel de Falla / Noches en los jardines de España
 Beethoven, Barenboim Masterclass: United by Beethoven, EMI
 Encuentro, Javier Perianes, Estrella Morente, HM

References

External links 
 Javier Perianes' Official Website 

Spanish classical pianists
Male classical pianists
1978 births
Living people
People from the Province of Huelva
21st-century classical pianists
21st-century male musicians
21st-century Spanish musicians
Spanish male musicians